The National Seismological Service (SSN) is a seismological organization in Mexico that studies and records earthquake activity within the country. It is part of the Geophysics Institute at the National Autonomous University of Mexico (UNAM) and is based in Mexico City.

The SSN was founded on September 5, 1910, by the federal government as part of an international effort to monitor seismic activity. It was transferred to UNAM in 1929 and became part of the UNAM Geophysics Institute in 1948. The SSN established its first nine earthquake monitoring stations were installed between 1910 and 1923, including seven that have operated continuously since as the oldest system in North America. Currently, the SSN has 22 seismic observatories and has plans to add 11 more to its nationwide system.

References

Further reading

External links
 National Seismological Service / Servicio Sismológico Nacional

Seismological observatories, organisations and projects
Organizations established in 1910
Science and technology in Mexico